This is a list of airports in Germany, sorted by location.

Germany, officially the Federal Republic of Germany, is a country in Central and Northern Europe. It is bordered to the north by the North Sea, Denmark, and the Baltic Sea; to the east by Poland and the Czech Republic; to the south by Austria and Switzerland; and to the west by France, Luxembourg, Belgium, and the Netherlands.

Germany is a federal republic consisting of sixteen states. The capital city of Germany is Berlin.

Airports 

Airport names shown in bold indicate the facility has scheduled passenger service on a commercial airline.

See also 
 List of airports by ICAO code: E#ED ET - Germany
 List of the busiest airports in Germany
 List of the busiest airports in Europe
 Transport in Germany
 Wikipedia:WikiProject Aviation/Airline destination lists: Europe#Germany

References

 Index of Military Aerodromes and Heliports. Military Aeronautical Information Publication Germany. 2 July 2009.
 
 
  – includes IATA codes
  – IATA and ICAO codes
  – ICAO codes and airport data

Airports
Germany
Airports
Germany